Edelmar Zanol (born 1 January 1975) is a Brazilian judoka. He competed in the men's middleweight event at the 1996 Summer Olympics.

References

1975 births
Living people
Brazilian male judoka
Olympic judoka of Brazil
Judoka at the 1996 Summer Olympics